Aleksey Akatyev (born 7 August 1974) is a retired male freestyle swimmer from Russia, who competed for his native country at the 1996 Summer Olympics in Atlanta, Georgia. Later on he started a career in open water swimming, winning several medals in international tournaments. he went to won Open water swimming in 5 km  and 25 km in 1998 World Aquatics Championships

References

External links

1974 births
Living people
Russian male freestyle swimmers
Male long-distance swimmers
Swimmers at the 1996 Summer Olympics
Olympic swimmers of Russia
World Aquatics Championships medalists in open water swimming
20th-century Russian people
21st-century Russian people